Hersilia tibialis is a species of spider of the genus Hersilia. It is native to India and Sri Lanka.

See also
 List of Hersiliidae species

References

Hersiliidae
Spiders of Asia
Spiders described in 1993